(814760 BCE) was the name of a Sanskrit grammarian, one who was a predecessor of Yaska and Panini in Iron Age India, circa 9th century BCE.

Ancient Grammarian
Śākaṭāyana was an early "etymologist" or nairukta. He is the oldest grammarian known by name, even though his work is only known indirectly, via references of Yaska and Panini's works.

Śākaṭāyana apparently claimed that all nouns are ultimately derived from verbal roots.  This process is reflected in the Sanskrit grammar as the system of krit-pratyayas or verbal affixes.

Bimal Krishna Matilal in his The word and the world  refers to the debate of nirkuta vs. vyakarana as an interesting philosophical discussion between the nairuktas or etymologists and the pāṇinīyas or grammarians.
 According to the  etymologists, all nouns (substantives) are derived from some verbal root or the other.  Yāska in his Nirukta refers to this view (in  fact defends it) and ascribes it to an earlier scholar Śākaṭāyana.  This would require that all words are to be analysable into atomic  elements, 'roots' or 'bases' and 'affixes' or 'inflections' —  better known in Sanskrit as dhātu and pratyaya [...] Yāska reported the view of Gārgya who opposed Śākaṭāyana (both preceded Pāṇini who  mentions them by name) and held that not all substantival words or  nouns (nāma) were to be derived from roots, for certain nominal stems were 'atomic'.

Sakatayana also proposed that functional morphemes such as prepositions do not have any meaning by themselves, but contribute to meaning only when attached to nouns or other content words:

(The ancient grammarian) Sakatayana says that prepositions when not attached (to nouns or verbs) do not express meanings; but Gargya says that they illustrate (or modify) the action which is expressed by a noun or verb, and that their senses are various (even when detached). This view was challenged by Gargya.  This debate goes to the heart of the compositionality debate among ancient Indian Mimamsakas and Vyakaran/grammarians.

See also
 Morphology

Notes

References

814 births
867 deaths
9th-century Indian Jains
9th-century Indian monks
9th-century Jain monks
Ancient Sanskrit grammarians
Indian Jain monks
Indian Sanskrit scholars